This is an incomplete list of musical compositions and pedagogical writings by the Spanish composer and pianist Enrique Granados.

Original works

Operas and theatrical works
 Miel de la Alcarria, incidental music in 3 acts, Op. 54 (1895)
 Ovillejos o La Gallina ciega, Sainete lírico in 2 acts (1897–98; incomplete)
 María del Carmen, opera in 3 acts (1898; incomplete)
 Blancaflor, incidental music in 1 act (1899)
 Petrarca, opera in 1 act (1899; incomplete)
 Picarol, drama líric in 1 act (1901)
 Follet, opera in 3 acts (1903)
 Gaziel, drama líric in 1 act (1906)
 Liliana, poema escénica in 1 act (1911)
 La Cieguecita de Betania, chamber opera in 1 act (1914)
 Goyescas, opera in 1 act (1915)
 Torrijos, incidental music

Orchestral
 Marcha de los Vencidos (1899)
 Suite sobre Cantos gallegos (1899)
 Dante, 2 Pieces for Orchestra, Op. 21 (1908)
 Elisenda, 4 Pieces (1912)
 Danza de los Ojos verdes
 Danza gitana
 "Intermezzo" from opera Goyescas
 "Navidad" from La Cieguecita de Betania
 La nit del mort (Poema desolación)
 Suite árabe u oriental

Chamber
 Canto, cello (1888)
 Piano Quintet in G minor, Op. 49 (1895)
 Piano Trio, Op. 50 (1895)
 Melodía, violin and piano (1903)
 Serenata, 2 violins and piano (1914; incomplete)
 Madrigal, cello and piano (1915)
 Escena religiosa, violin, organ, piano and timpani
 Intermedios para la Misa de Boda de Dionisio Conde, string quartet, harp, organ
 Pequeña Romanza, string quartet
 Romanza, violin and piano
 Violin Sonata
 3 Preludios, violin and piano
 Trio, 2 violins and viola
 Trova, cello and piano

Piano
 Dans le Bois (1888)
 En la Aldea, 10 Pieces for Piano 4-hands (1888)
 París, Album with 37 Pieces (1888)
 Arabesca (1890)
 Canción moresca (1890)
 12 Danzas españolas (1890)
 Mazurka alla polacca (1890)
 Serenata Amparo (1890)
 Serenata española (1890)
 La Sirena, Vals Mignone (1890)
 Los Soldados de cartón (1890)
 A mi queridísimo Isaac (1894)

 Balada (1895)
 8 Valses poéticos (1895)
 Jota de Miel de la Alcarria (1897)
 Exquise...!, Vals tzigane (1900)
 Rapsodía aragonesa (1901)
 Allegro de concierto, Op. 46 (1904)
 Escenas románticas, 6 Pieces (1904)
 Goyescas, 7 Pieces (1911)
 Bocetos: Colección de Obras fáciles, 4 Pieces (1912; incomplete)
 Escenas poéticas, 7 Pieces (1912)
 2 Impromptus (1912)
 Libro de Horas, 3 Pieces (1913; incomplete)
 A la Cubana, 2 Pieces, Op. 36 (1914)
 El Pelele (Escena goyesca) (1914)
 Valse de Concert, Op. 35 (1914)
 Danza lenta y Sardana, 2 Dances, Op. 37 (1915)
 Marche militaire, Op. 38 (1915)
 A la Antigua
 A la Pradera, Op. 35
 Allegro appassionato
 Andalucía
 Andantino espressivo
 Aparición, 15 Pieces
 Barcarola, Op. 45
 La Berceuse
 Canción arabe
 Canto del Pescador
 Capricho español, Op. 39
 Carezza, Op. 38
 Cartas de Amor, 4 Valses íntimos, Op. 44 (incomplete)
 Cheherazada, Fantasia for Piano, Op. 34 (1912; incomplete)
 Clotilde, Mazurka
 Crepúsculo
 Cuentos de la Juventud, 10 Pieces, Op. 1
 Danza característica
 Dolora en La menor
 Elvira, Mazurka
 Escenas infantiles, 5 Pieces, Op. 38 (bis)
 7 Estudios
 6 Estudios expresivos en Forma de Piezas fáciles
 La Góndola
 L'Himne dels Morts
 Impromptu, Op. 39 (1914)
 Intermezzo from opera Goyescas
 Jácara, Danza para cantar y bailar, Op. 14
 Jeunesse, Melodía
 Marcha real
 2 Marchas militares, piano 4-hands
 Mazurka alla polacca, Op. 2
 Mazurka in A minor, Op. 20
 Melodía
 Melodía para el Abanico de Laura González
 Melodía para el Abanico de Lola González
 Minuetto
 Moresque y Canción arabe
 Oriental, Canción variada, Intermedio y Final
 Paisaje, Op. 35
 Países soñados (incomplete)
 Parranda-Murcia (incomplete)
 Pastoral
 6 Piezas sobre cantos populares españoles
 Preludio in D major, Op. 30
 Reverie-Improvisation
 Serenata goyesca
 10 Valses sentimentales

Voice and piano
 La Boibra (1902)
 Cançó d'amor (1902)
 L'Ocell profeta (1911)
 Elegía eterna (1914)
 12 Tonadillas en estilo antiguo (1914)
 Canciones amatorias, 7 Songs (1914/15)
 Canción del Postillón (1916)
 Balada (incomplete)
 Canción (incomplete)
 Canco de Gener
 Canconeta Dorm Nineta, Op. 51
 Cantar I
 Canto gitano
 El Cavaller s'en va a la guerra
 Día y noche Diego ronda
 Mignon
 Por una Mirada, un Mundo
 El Rey y'l juglar (incomplete)
 Serenata
 Si al Retiro me llevas (Tonadilla)
 Yo no tengo quien me llore
 El majo timido

Choral
 Salve Regina (1896)
 Cant de les Estrelles (1911)
 L'Herba de Amor (1914)

Arrangements and transcriptions 
 Isaac Albéniz: "Triana" from Iberia, arr. 2 pianos
 J. S. Bach: Chorale, arr. chamber orchestra
 Bach: Fugue in C-sharp minor, arr. orchestra (1900)
 Chopin:  Piano Concerto No. 2, re-orchestration of 1st movement (1900)
 Muzio Clementi: 4 Sonatinas, Op.36, arr. string trio (1891)
 Francesco Corselli: Sonata, arr. piano
 Domenico Scarlatti: 26 Sonatas, arr. piano
 Franz Schubert: Momento musical
 Jota aragonesa, arr. piano and orchestra (1904)

Pedagogical works 
 Breves Consideraciones sobre el Ligado
 Dificultades especiales del Piano
 Ejercicios de Terceras
 Método, teórico-práctico, para el Uso de los Pedales del Piano
 Ornamentos
 El Piano
 Reglas para el Uso de los Pedales del Piano (1913)

Sources 
 IMSLP: List of works by Enrique Granados

 
Lists of compositions by composer
Lists of piano compositions by composer
Piano compositions in the 20th century